Mordechai Elgrably (born 14 July 1944) is an Israeli former politician who served as a member of the Knesset for several parties between 1977 and 1981.

Biography
Born in Meknes in Morocco, Elgrably received a religious education and was a member of the scout movement. He made aliyah to Israel in 1964, and studied economics and mathematics at the Hebrew University of Jerusalem, gaining an MA.

He became chairman of the Oded movement in 1969, and worked as Deputy Director of Planning in the Ministry of Education and Culture between 1971 and 1977.

In 1977 he joined the new Democratic Movement for Change (Dash) party, and was elected to the Knesset on its list in the elections that year. When the party split in 1978 he joined the Democratic Movement faction, but on 5 February 1980 left to sit as an independent. On 19 May the following year he joined Saadia Marciano's Equality in Israel - Panthers faction, which was renamed the Unity Party. He lost his seat in the June 1981 elections when the party failed to cross the electoral threshold.

References

External links
 

1944 births
People from Meknes
20th-century Moroccan Jews
Moroccan emigrants to Israel
Hebrew University of Jerusalem alumni
Israeli civil servants
Living people
Democratic Movement (Israel) politicians
Democratic Movement for Change politicians
Unity Party (Israel) politicians
Members of the 9th Knesset (1977–1981)